Komehr (also known as Kūmehr) is a village in Komehr Rural District, in the Central District of Sepidan County, Fars Province, Iran. At the 2006 census, its population was 1,722, in 379 families.

History
The village was buried, leaving no survivors, during the 1972 Iran blizzard.

References 

Populated places in Sepidan County